Lee Williams (born December 27, 1981) is an American professional golfer who plays on the PGA Tour.

Williams was born in Alexander City, Alabama. He had a successful amateur career, representing the United States in the Walker Cup in 2003 and 2005. He played college golf at Auburn University and turned professional after graduating in 2005.

Williams played on the US Pro Golf Tour and the NGA Pro Golf Tour before settling into the Nationwide Tour in 2012. He picked up his first win on the Nationwide Tour on June 10 at the Mexico Open. He finished 16th on the money list to earn his PGA Tour card for 2013.

Williams made only 9 cuts in 22 events in 2013, and ranked 196th in the money list. He played in the Web.com Tour Finals and finished 31st to retain his PGA Tour card for 2014. In 2013–14, he played in only 13 events due to injury. He has not played in a PGA Tour event since the 2014 FedEx St. Jude Classic and has a six-event medical extension available upon his return.

Amateur wins (4)
2001 Greystone Invitational
2002 Southern Amateur
2003 Dogwood Invitational, Greystone Invitational

Professional wins (4)

Web.com Tour wins (1)

Other wins (3)
2 wins on the US Pro Golf Tour, 1 on the NGA Pro Golf Tour

Results in major championships

CUT = missed the half-way cut
"T" = tied
Note: Williams only played in the U.S. Open.

U.S. national team appearances
Amateur
Walker Cup: 2003, 2005 (winners)
Eisenhower Trophy: 2004 (winners)

See also
2012 Web.com Tour graduates
2013 Web.com Tour Finals graduates

References

External links

American male golfers
Auburn Tigers men's golfers
PGA Tour golfers
Korn Ferry Tour graduates
Golfers from Alabama
People from Alexander City, Alabama
1981 births
Living people